St. Joseph's College, abbreviated to SJC, established in 1884, is a prominent CISCE-affiliated elite school in Allahabad, Uttar Pradesh, India, with high rankings both in the state and in India.

It is affiliated with the Council for the Indian School Certificate Examinations. With over 10,000 students collectively enrolled within its main, annexes, and girls' wing campuses, the college is one of the largest schools of Prayagraj in terms of enrolment. The college's motto is   Always Aim High.

Reverend Father Thomas Kumar is the current principal of the college. Students of the institution are known as Josephites.

History
St. Joseph's College, was founded in the 19th century (1884) by the Lokmani Lal from the provinces of Ancona & Bologna, Italy, under the management of the Roman Catholic Diocese of Allahabad. It began as a rented house that housed a small parochial school for the Cathedral Parish. The foundation stone of the core of the present building was laid by Right Reverend Dr. Peschi on 1 January 1884. Bishop Poli called the school St. Joseph's Collegiate. It became a middle school in 1887, which was recognized as "European High School" affiliated with Cambridge University. In 1907, it came directly under the bishop & the parish priest of the cathedral. It was handed over to the Irish Christian brothers of Nainital in 1908 before passing hands to Bishop Gamigna. With 26 students boarding at first, the total went up to 63 in 1920. The school was later affiliated to the Council for the Indian School Certificate Examinations (ICSE) and the school building was further extended with the class 7th & 8th block, along with the Chemistry Lab block put up by Reverend Father Augustine between 1932 and 1942. In the 1960s the Class IX-X block & the junior section block was built along with a large auditorium, a gymnasium, and a swimming pool by Reverend Father Cyril E. George.

The school's boarding program closed in 1980 and the buildings were converted into biology & physics laboratories along with four classrooms. In 1983 the commerce section was added by Reverend Father Thomas D’Souza. The boarding program resumed in 2006-2007 by Reverend Father Louis Mascarenhas. In 2007 a state of art Computer Lab was added followed by a toilet block in 2008. In 2009, another wing, "Jubilee Block" was installed in the junior section with a broad staircase and an elevator by Mascarenhas to mark the 125th year. Other projects were taken up such as an open stage and portico in front of the old building with a statue of St. Joseph. A reading room was named after Father Rego and renovated with full air-conditioning with the help of alumni of 1985. The chemistry lab was given a running L.P. gas line with the help of 1986 alumni. The 1987 alumni proposed to build a cafeteria. A lawn tennis court was added in the year 2013 with the help of the 1988 alumni. The Rego Scholar Award and Rego English Excellence awards were awarded to the top students of ICSE. Digital classrooms were introduced and the E care department was added in the year 2011.

A new stage was constructed in the Hogan Hall and the staff room was moved near the reading room in 2012. Three classrooms were added above the Chemistry lab and a music room and an art room were built above the cafeteria. Father Antony K.K. resumed the Old Boys Association. The Sharad Verma Memorial Inter-school debate competition was instituted in memory of Sharad Verma, an alumnus. Mascarenhas arrived in 2005 and resumed the commerce section in 2006. In the year 2007 a state-of-the-art computer lab was added, followed by a bathroom.

Vijayanta, the first Indian manufactured battle tank of the Indian Army was dedicated to future generations of Josephites by alumni who joined the Indian Army and served on the highest ranks in the military staff. The memorandum stone states "May this trophy symbolizing the gallant Indian Armed Forces motivate the future generations of the school to achieve unprecedented glory in every field of their endeavor". The "Vijayanta" tank is an indigenously made tank known for its role in the Indo-Pakistani wars of 1965 and 1971. The college also has an Indian Air Force Mig 21 supersonic fighter jet aircraft gifted to the students by the then-Air Chief Marshal of the Indian Air Force and a former alumnus, Norman Anil Kumar Browne. The college was later gifted a triad of three torpedoes from the Indian Navy as a mark of respect from the alumni who served in the commanding naval leadership towards the college.

Josephest
The biggest cultural event of the college is Josephest, which is held annually at the end of October. A number of schools from the city as well as from other cities in the state participate. A multitude of events are organized during the two-day festival that range from literary, art and craft, music and dance competitions to skits, quizzes and computer programming competitions.

Major events are held in the main auditorium, which has a seating capacity of over 12000 
people. Minor events are either organised in the Hogan Hall, the reading room or the respective designated areas such as the computer laboratory, gymnasium, or art room. The events are judged by distinguished jury members invited from various institutions and organisations in Allahabad.

Notable alumni
Raghunandan Swarup Pathak – former Chief Justice of India
V. N. Khare – former Chief Justice of India
Norman Anil Kumar Browne – former Chief of Air Staff, Indian Air Force
Yogendra Dimri - General Officer Commanding - in Chief, Central Command, Indian Army
Syed Ahmad Ali – Indian army officer, former pro-vice chancellor of Aligarh Muslim University
Mriganka Sur – neuroscientist
Amit Agrawal – professor
Prashant Bhushan – lawyer, activist
Rahul Kanwal – journalist
Tigmanshu Dhulia – director, actor, screenwriter, film producer
Madan Lokur – former judge at the Supreme Court of India
Vikram Montrose - prominent Indian music producer, composer and song writer

References

High schools and secondary schools in Uttar Pradesh
Christian schools in Uttar Pradesh
Schools in Allahabad
Educational institutions established in 1884
1884 establishments in India